Chi-young Kim is a Korean-to-English literary translator who lives in the United States.

Originally having trained as a lawyer and translating as a hobby helping her mom, Kim became a professional literary translator after graduation, whe she starting working for a publishing company in New York. Her work includes the English translations of the award-winning novels Please Look After Mom by Shin Kyung-sook and The Hen Who Dreamed She Could Fly by Hwang Seon-mi.

Other internationally acclaimed translated works are Your Republic is Calling You by Kim Young-ha or The Investigation by Lee Jung-myung.

References

Sources
Translator Behind Int'l Success of Korean Novels, profile in The Chosun Ilbo, 21 May 2014.
https://web.archive.org/web/20140524023257/http://www.englishpen.org/capturing-the-mood/

External links

Korean–English translators
21st-century American translators
Year of birth missing (living people)
Living people